The Black Forest Girl may refer to:
The Black Forest Girl (1920 film), a silent German film directed by Arthur Wellin
The Black Forest Girl (1929 film), a silent German film directed by Victor Janson
The Black Forest Girl (1933 film), a German film directed by Georg Zoch
The Black Forest Girl (1950 film), a West German film directed by 	Hans Deppe
Schwarzwaldmädel (Black Forest Girl), a 1917 operetta by German composer Leon Jessel